The Präzer Höhi (also known as Mutta) is a mountain of the Swiss Lepontine Alps, situated near Thusis in the canton of Graubünden. It lies on the range between the valleys of Safien and Domleschg.

References

External links
 Präzer Höhi on Hikr

Mountains of the Alps
Mountains of Switzerland
Mountains of Graubünden
Lepontine Alps
Thusis